Wizard's Attic was an American role-playing game wholesaler and fulfillment house servicing small publishers. It was collapsed in 2004.

History
Wizard's Attic was formed in order to act as a fulfillment house for Chaosium.

Aldo Ghiozzi's Wingnut Games was one of Wizard's Attic's consolidation clients, and in 2002, Wizard's Attic's business was starting to falter and clients like Ghiozzi were starting to see their payments dry up.   Just as Wizard's Attic was trying to get out of the consolidation business, Ghiozzi decided to move his small company Impressions Advertising & Marketing into the field. Impressions used Wizard's Attic as its original base of consolidation operations, so Eric Rowe set aside a corner of the Wizard's Attic warehouse for Ghiozzi and his first three clients – Citizen Games, Troll Lord Games and Wingnut Games – and shipped their products as required. By the end of 2002, when Wizard's Attic was shutting down all of its business except for fulfilment, Eric Rowe of Wizard's Attic gave 80 consolidation customers to Ghiozzi. However, by 2003 Wizard's Attic was about to get locked out of its remaining warehouse in Kentucky and the product of all of Ghiozzi's clients was there, so Ghiozzi flew to Kentucky to rescue nine palettes of merchandise, which were shipped to Chessex, who became Impressions' new shipper. In 2004 OtherWorld Creations's production came to a halt when both their distributor Wizard's Attic and the d20 market collapsed.

According to Sebastian Deterding and José Zagal, the collapse of Wizard's Attic left "many small publishers with huge financial debts from unpaid revenues and copies of their games that were never returned".

References

Role-playing game publishing companies